Café Nashville Radio Show is a syndicated radio program owned and operated by OnAir Broadcasting, INC. Cafe Nashville.

Host of Café Nashville

Café Nashville is hosted by Jody Van-Alin and Jodi Brook. 

Café Nashville is produced by Ruby Cortez.

Cafe Nashville assistant producer is Sydney Sullivan. 

The show engineer is Brandon Kaly.

History 

Café Nashville launched in March 2008 on WKDF in Nashville, Tennessee.

On April 1, 2013, Café Nashville launched a night-time show.  The first affiliate was KAWO in Boise Idaho.

Affiliates

Current affiliates

WTGE - Baton Rouge, Louisiana
KAWO - Boise, Idaho
WUSJ - Jackson, MS
WBQQ - Kennebunk Port, ME
WTHT - Portland, ME
KUPL - Portland, OR
KPLM - Palm Springs, CA

CMR Nashville - London, England

References

External links 

 
 

American country music radio programs